Antony Ralph Marinon Opatha (5 August 1947 – 11 September 2020) was a Sri Lankan cricketer. A right-arm medium pace bowler, he played five One Day Internationals at the 1975 and 1979 Cricket World Cups.

Educated at St. Peter's College, Colombo he joined the Royal Ceylon Volunteer Air Force in 1968. He had played for his college cricket team and went on to play for the air force cricket team until 1977. He first played for Ceylon in 1971 and was a member of the Sri Lankan teams  playing in the World Cups in England in 1975 and 1979. He later played club cricket in Ireland for one season in 1979 and was offered the post of coach of the Holland team.

As player/manager of the rebel tour to South Africa in 1982–83 in defiance of the sporting ban against the apartheid state, he and the other tourists received a lifetime ban from international cricket.

In September 2018, he was one of 49 former Sri Lankan cricketers felicitated by Sri Lanka Cricket, to honour them for their services before Sri Lanka became a full member of the International Cricket Council (ICC).

References

External links
Cricinfo article on Tony Opatha

1947 births
2020 deaths
Sri Lankan cricketers
Sri Lanka One Day International cricketers
All-Ceylon cricketers
Cricketers at the 1975 Cricket World Cup
Cricketers at the 1979 Cricket World Cup
Sri Lankan Air Force airmen
Alumni of St. Peter's College, Colombo
Sri Lankan cricket coaches
Cricketers from Colombo